The Graded Salience Hypothesis is a theory regarding the psycholinguistic processing of word meaning, specifically in the context of irony, developed by Rachel Giora. It assumes that priority is given in the psychological activation and semantic retrieval of salient over less salient meanings inside the mental lexicon in the process of language comprehension.

Lexical salience 

The meaning(s) of a word can be considered salient if the associated meanings(s) is/are coded for in the mental lexicon. That said, the degree of salience of a given word meaning cannot be viewed as a permanent, defining characteristic, but rather as a function of a number of psycholinguistic factors, such as frequency, conventionality, familiarity, and prototypicality. The more frequent, conventional, familiar, or prototypical a given word meaning is, the greater degree of salience it holds.

Hypothesis 

The graded salience hypothesis revolves around two major assumptions:
1. A salient meaning of a word is always activated and cannot be bypassed.
2. A salient meaning is always activated before any less salient meanings.

Role of context 

In the view of the graded salience hypothesis, context has a very limited role. Even though it can facilitate activation of a word meaning, it cannot inhibit the process of the more salient meaning activation.

See also 

 Gradient Salience Model
 Irony

References

Further reading 

Giora Rachel. 2002. "Literal vs. figurative language: Different or equal?", Journal of Pragmatics 34: 487–506.
Giora Rachel & Ofer Fein. 1999. "Irony comprehension: The graded salience hypothesis", Humor 12-4: 425–436.
Kecskes Istvan. 2006. "On my mind: thought about salience, context and figurative language from a second language perspective": Second Language Research 22,2: 1-19.

External links 
 http://www.tau.ac.il/~giorar/articles.htm

Irony
Semantics